The Castle is a  summit in Capitol Reef National Park in Wayne County, Utah, United States. Precipitation runoff from this feature is drained by tributaries of the Fremont River.

Geology
The uppermost portion of The Castle is composed of hard, jointed Wingate Sandstone, which is great for rock climbing, and is believed to have formed about 200 million years ago. This overlays the exposed gray-green layer of the Chinle Formation which was laid down as volcanic ash about 225 million years ago, and beneath Chinle is the Moenkopi Formation (about 245 million years old), all of which date to the Triassic. Long after the sedimentary rocks were deposited, the Colorado Plateau was uplifted relatively evenly, keeping the layers roughly horizontal, but Capitol Reef is an exception because of the Waterpocket Fold, a classic monocline, which formed between 50 and 70 million years ago during the Laramide Orogeny.

Gallery

Climate
Spring and fall are the most favorable seasons to visit The Castle. According to the Köppen climate classification system, it is located in a Cold semi-arid climate zone, which is defined by the coldest month having an average mean temperature below 32 °F (0 °C), and at least 50% of the total annual precipitation being received during the spring and summer.

See also

 Colorado Plateau
 Geology of the Capitol Reef area
 Chimney Rock

References

External links

 Capitol Reef National Park National Park Service
 The Castle: Weather forecast

Mountains of Utah
Capitol Reef National Park
Mountains of Wayne County, Utah
Sandstone formations of the United States
Buttes of Utah